Gabral (also spelled Gabrāl, or Ghabral) is a village and union council in Swat District of Khyber Pakhtunkhwa province, Pakistan. It is located on the slopes of the western end of the Himalayas, at the lower end of the Gabral Valley, where the Gabral River joins the Utror River, a tributary of the Swat River.

The main road of the town runs next to the river and up the valley, for about 14 km. A few farms are seen up to that point.

See also
Matiltan
Mahodand

References

External links

Swat Kohistan
Populated places in Swat District
Union Councils of Swat District